Ultras White Knights07 often referred as UWK07 is an Egyptian Ultras group that supports Zamalek SC in every sport. It was founded on 17 March 2007.

Formation
UWK first appearance was in a CAF Champions League match between Zamalek and Al-Hilal on 17 March 2007, the stadium was full. It was formed to support the team even more by creating chants, banners, in short changing the atmosphere at the stadium and supporting the team until the 90 minutes end. The group's leader is Sayed Moshagheb, who is currently incarcerated based on political charges.

References

Zamalek SC
Ultras groups